East Timor–Japan relations are foreign relations between East Timor and Japan. Diplomatic relations were established in September 2002. East Timor has an embassy in Tokyo. Japan has an embassy in Dili.

History 
Japan-East Timor relations were established on May 20, 2002, when UN Administration of the Area was abolished, replaced by the Government of East Timor. The Japanese government has had an "ambassadorial-level representative office in Dili on the day.
Japan is the third aid donors to East Timor.

See also
Foreign relations of East Timor
Foreign relations of Japan

References

 
Japan
Bilateral relations of Japan
2002 establishments in Japan
2002 establishments in East Timor